Antonín Křapka (born 22 January 1994) is a professional Czech football defender playing for Bohemians 1905 in Czech First League.

He made his league debut on 25 April 2015 in Mladá Boleslav's surprising 2–1 Czech First League away win against FC Viktoria Plzeň. After playing Czech National Football League (2nd tier) for FK Ústí nad Labem and FK Pardubice on loan in 2016 and 2017, he returned to his home club in winter of 2018.

He made two appearances for Czech Republic national under-21 football team in 2016.

References

External links

Antonín Křapka Official international statistics

1994 births
Living people
Czech footballers
Czech Republic under-21 international footballers
Czech First League players
FK Mladá Boleslav players
FK Ústí nad Labem players
FK Pardubice players
Association football defenders
MFK Karviná players
Czech National Football League players
Bohemians 1905 players
Sportspeople from Mladá Boleslav